Symphony No. 40 in G minor, K. 550 was written by Wolfgang Amadeus Mozart in 1788. It is sometimes referred to as the "Great G minor symphony", to distinguish it from the "Little G minor symphony", No. 25. The two are the only extant minor key symphonies Mozart wrote.

History

Composition
The date of completion of this symphony is known exactly, since Mozart in his mature years kept a full catalog of his completed works; he entered the 40th Symphony into it on 25 July 1788. Work on the symphony occupied an exceptionally productive period of just a few weeks during which time he also completed the 39th and 41st symphonies (26 June and 10 August, respectively). Nikolaus Harnoncourt conjectured that Mozart composed the three symphonies as a unified work, pointing, among other things, to the fact that the Symphony No. 40, as the middle work, has no introduction (unlike No. 39) and does not have a finale of the scale of No. 41's.

The 40th symphony exists in two versions, differing primarily in that one includes parts for a pair of clarinets (with suitable adjustments made in the other wind parts). Most likely, the clarinet parts were added in a revised version. The autograph scores of both versions were acquired in the 1860s by Johannes Brahms, who later donated the manuscripts to the Gesellschaft der Musikfreunde in Vienna, where they reside today.

Premiere
As Neal Zaslaw has pointed out, writers on Mozart have often suggested – or even asserted – that Mozart never heard his 40th Symphony performed. Some commentators go further, suggesting that Mozart wrote the symphony (and its companions, Nos. 39 and 41) without even intending it to be performed, but rather for posterity, as (to use Alfred Einstein's words) an "appeal to eternity".

Modern scholarship suggests that these conjectures are not correct. First, in a recently discovered 10 July 1802 letter by the musician Johann Wenzel (1762–1831) to the publisher  in Leipzig, Wenzel refers to a performance of the symphony at the home of Baron Gottfried van Swieten with Mozart present, but the execution was so poor that the composer had to leave the room.

There is strong circumstantial evidence for other, probably better, performances. On several occasions between the composition of the symphony and the composer's death, symphony concerts were given featuring Mozart's music for which copies of the program have survived, announcing a symphony unidentified by date or key. These include:

Dresden, 14 April 1789, during Mozart's Berlin journey
Leipzig, 12 May 1789, on the same trip
Frankfurt, 15 October 1790
Copies survive of a poster for a concert given by the Tonkünstler-Societät (Society of Musicians) 17 April 1791 in the Burgtheater in Vienna, conducted by Mozart's colleague Antonio Salieri. The first item on the program was billed as "A Grand Symphony composed by Herr Mozart".

Most important is the fact that Mozart revised his symphony (see above). As Zaslaw says, this "demonstrates that [the symphony] was performed, for Mozart would hardly have gone to the trouble of adding the clarinets and rewriting the flutes and oboes to accommodate them, had he not had a specific performance in view." The orchestra for the 1791 Vienna concert included the clarinetist brothers Anton and Johann Nepomuk Stadler; which, as Zaslaw points out, limits the possibilities to just the 39th and 40th symphonies.

Zaslaw adds: "The version without clarinets must also have been performed, for the reorchestrated version of two passages in the slow movement, which exists in Mozart's hand, must have resulted from his having heard the work and discovered an aspect needing improvement."

Regarding the concerts for which the Symphony was originally intended when it was composed in 1788, Otto Erich Deutsch suggests that Mozart was preparing to hold a series of three "Concerts in the Casino", in a new casino in the Spiegelgasse owned by Philipp Otto. Mozart even sent a pair of tickets for this series to his friend Michael Puchberg. But it seems impossible to determine whether the concert series was held, or was cancelled for lack of interest. Zaslaw suggests that only the first of the three concerts was actually held.

Music

The symphony is scored (in its revised version) for flute, 2 oboes, 2 clarinets, 2 bassoons, 2 horns, and strings.

The work is in four movements, in the usual arrangement for a classical-style symphony (fast movement, slow movement, minuet, fast movement):

I. Molto allegro 
The first movement begins darkly, not with its first theme but with the accompaniment, played by the lower strings with divided violas. The technique of beginning a work with an accompaniment figure was later used by Mozart in his last piano concerto (KV. 595) and later became a favorite of the Romantics (examples include the openings of Mendelssohn's Violin Concerto and Sergei Rachmaninoff's Third Piano Concerto). The first theme is as follows.

II. Andante 
The second movement is a lyrical work in  time. It is in the subdominant key of the relative major of G minor (B major): E major. The contrapuntal opening bars of this movement appear thus in keyboard reduction:

III. Menuetto. Allegretto – Trio 
The minuet begins with an angry, cross-accented hemiola rhythm and a pair of three-bar phrases, as shown in the following piano reduction:

Various commentators have asserted that while the music is labeled "minuet", it would hardly be suitable for dancing. The contrasting gentle trio section, in G major, alternates the playing of the string section with that of the winds.

IV. Finale. Allegro assai 
The fourth movement opens with a series of rapidly ascending notes outlining the tonic triad illustrating what is commonly referred to as the Mannheim rocket.

A remarkable modulating passage in which every tone in the chromatic scale but one is played, strongly destabilizing the key, occurs at the beginning of the development section; the single note left out is G (the tonic):

Legacy

Reception 
This work has elicited varying interpretations from critics. Robert Schumann regarded it as possessing "Grecian lightness and grace". Donald Tovey saw in it the character of opera buffa. Almost certainly, however, the most common perception today is that the symphony is tragic in tone and intensely emotional; for example, in The Classical Style, Charles Rosen calls the symphony "a work of passion, violence, and grief."

Although interpretations differ, the symphony is unquestionably one of Mozart's most greatly admired works, and it is frequently performed and recorded.

Influence 
Ludwig van Beethoven knew the symphony well, copying out 29 bars from the score in one of his sketchbooks. As Gustav Nottebohm observed in 1887, the copied bars appear amid the sketches for Beethoven's Fifth Symphony, whose third movement begins with a pitch sequence similar to that of Mozart's finale (see example below).

Franz Schubert likewise copied down the music of Mozart's minuet, and the minuet of his Fifth Symphony strongly evokes Mozart's. Zaslaw has suggested that a passage late in Joseph Haydn's oratorio The Seasons (1801), a meditation on death, quotes the second movement of the 40th Symphony and was included by Haydn as a memorial to his long-dead friend.

The symphony has been widely recorded and adapted by many orchestras. Vince Guaraldi adapted the symphony as a jazz piece in the opening track of his 1964 studio album "From All Sides", "Choro". Lebanese singer Fairuz also adapted the symphony for her 1972 song “Ya Ana Ya Ana.”

First recording 
The first known recording of the 40th Symphony was issued by the Victor Talking Machine Company in 1915 under the title "Symphony in G Minor". The Victor Concert Orchestra performed under the direction of Victor's house conductor, Walter B. Rogers.

See also
 Mozart and G minor

Notes

References

Bibliography 

 Extracts online at Google Books.

 Available online 
  Online at Google Books.

 Extracts cited at Google Books.

Further reading
Schoenberg, Arnold (1954, revised 1969). Structural Functions of Harmony. New York: W. W. Norton. Analyzes the wide-ranging development sections of both outer movements at some length.

External links 

Kalmus miniature editions, from the William and Gayle Cook Music Library at the Indiana University Jacobs School of Music
A public domain version by the Columbia University Orchestra at TEOC Classical Music Radio: Symphony No. 40
The apartment where Mozart wrote his last three Symphonies: Michael Lorenz, "Mozart's Apartment on the Alsergrund"

40
1788 compositions
Compositions in G minor